The 2009–10 Kazakhstan Hockey Championship was the 18th season of the Kazakhstan Hockey Championship, the top level of ice hockey in Kazakhstan. Eight teams participated in the league, and Saryarka Karagandy won the championship.

Regular season

Playoffs

References
Kazakh Ice Hockey Federation

Kazakhstan Hockey Championship
Kazakhstan Hockey Championship seasons
1